Robert Gravier (5 September 1905 - 15 July 2005) was a French politician. He served as a member of the French Senate from 1946 to 1974, where he represented Meurthe-et-Moselle.

References

1905 births
2005 deaths
People from Meurthe-et-Moselle
French Senators of the Fourth Republic
French Senators of the Fifth Republic
Senators of Meurthe-et-Moselle